Sevenmile Mountain is a summit in Maricopa County, Arizona.

References

Landforms of Maricopa County, Arizona